Lozhani is a village in Municipality of Struga, North Macedonia.

Notable people
 Veliče Šumulikoski (born 1981), footballer.

References

Villages in Struga Municipality